Clifton Eugene Abraham, Jr. (born December 9, 1971) is a former American and Canadian football player who was a defensive back in the National Football League (NFL) for three seasons.  He played college football for Florida State University, and was recognized as an All-American.  He played professionally for the Tampa Bay Buccaneers, Chicago Bears and Carolina Panthers of the NFL. Abraham also played for the Toronto Argonauts of the Canadian Football League.

Early years
Abraham was born in Dallas, Texas.  He attended David W. Carter High School in Dallas, where he played for the Carter Cowboys high school football team.

College football
While attending Florida State University, Abraham played for the Florida State Seminoles football team from 1991 to 1994.  As a junior, he received honorable mention All-American recognition from United Press International in 1993.  As a senior in 1994, he was recognized as a consensus first-team All-American, having received first-team honors from the American Football Coaches Association, the Associated Press, College Football News, The Sporting News, United Press International and the Walter Camp Foundation.

Professional career
In three NFL seasons, he appeared in nine regular season games.

Abraham was later signed by the Toronto Argonauts of the Canadian Football League, and he played for that organization for three seasons from 1998–99 and 2001. Appearing in a total of 21 games, Abraham recorded 58 tackles, 13 pass deflections, two interceptions for 48 yards, and one fumble recovery. He was most successful in 1998 when he played in only 10 games but made 35 tackles.

He finished his pro football career with the Los Angeles Xtreme of the XFL in 2001.

References

1971 births
Living people
All-American college football players
Carolina Panthers players
Chicago Bears players
Florida State Seminoles football players
Los Angeles Xtreme players
Toronto Argonauts players
Tampa Bay Buccaneers players
Players of American football from Texas
Players of Canadian football from Dallas
American football defensive backs
Canadian football defensive backs